The 2006 United States House of Representatives elections were held on November 7, 2006, to elect members to the United States House of Representatives. It took place in the middle of President George W. Bush's second term in office. All 435 seats of the House were up for election. Those elected served in the 110th United States Congress from January 3, 2007, until January 3, 2009. The incumbent majority party, the Republicans, had won majorities in the House consecutively since 1994, and were defeated by the Democrats who won a majority in the chamber, ending 12 years of Republican control in the House.

The Republicans had won a 232-seat majority in 2004, but by the time of the 2006 election, they held 229 seats, while the Democrats held 201, plus 1 Independent (Bernie Sanders) who caucused with the Democrats. There were also four vacancies. Democrats needed to pick up 15 seats to take control of the House, which had been in Republican control since January 1995. Along with the historical "sixth-year itch" that has plagued many incumbent presidents in midterm elections, the public's perception of George W. Bush, the handling of the wars in Iraq and Afghanistan, and a series of political scandals involving mostly congressional Republicans took their toll on the party at the ballot box.

The final result was a 31-seat pickup for the Democrats, including the pickup of the Vermont at-large seat, previously held by Independent Bernie Sanders (who ran instead for U.S. Senate), who caucused with the Democrats. Democrats defeated 22 Republican incumbents and won eight open Republican-held seats. For the first time since the party's founding, Republicans won no seats previously held by Democrats and defeated no Democratic incumbents. It was the largest seat gain for the Democrats since the 1974 elections. Among the new Democrats were the first Muslim in Congress (Keith Ellison) and the first two Buddhists (Mazie Hirono and Hank Johnson). As a result of the Democratic victory, Nancy Pelosi became the first female and the first Californian House Speaker.

, these remain the only House elections in U.S. history where only one party flipped any seats. 2006 remains the last year in which Republicans won a house race in Connecticut and the last time the Democrats won control of the House without winning every seat in New England.

Results

Federal 

|-
!style="background-color:#E9E9E9" colspan="2" rowspan="2" | Party
!style="background-color:#E9E9E9;text-align:center;" colspan="4" | Seats
!style="background-color:#E9E9E9;text-align:center;" colspan="3" | Popular vote
|-
! style="background-color:#E9E9E9;text-align:center;" | 2004
! style="background-color:#E9E9E9;text-align:center;" | 2006
! style="background-color:#E9E9E9;text-align:center;" | Netchange
! style="background-color:#E9E9E9;text-align:center;" | %
! style="background-color:#E9E9E9;text-align:center;" | Vote
! style="background-color:#E9E9E9;text-align:center;" | %
! style="background-color:#E9E9E9;text-align:center;" | +/−
|-
| style="background-color: #0000ff; width: 5px" |
| style="text-align: left" | Democratic Party
| style="text-align:right;" | 202
| style="text-align:right;" | 233
| style="text-align:right;" |  31
| style="text-align:right;" | 53.6%
| style="text-align:right;" | 42,338,795
| style="text-align:right;" | 52.3%
| style="text-align:right;" | +5.5%
|-
| style="background-color: #ff0000; width: 5px" |
| style="text-align: left" | Republican Party
| style="text-align:right;" | 232
| style="text-align:right;" | 202
| style="text-align:right;" |  30
| style="text-align:right;" | 46.4%
| style="text-align:right;" | 35,857,334
| style="text-align:right;" | 44.3%
| style="text-align:right;" | −5.1%
|-
|-
| style="background-color:;" | 
| style="text-align:left;" |Libertarian Party
| style="text-align:right;" | −
| style="text-align:right;" | −
| style="text-align:right;" | −
| style="text-align:right;" | −
| style="text-align:right;" | 656,764
| style="text-align:right;" | 0.8%
| style="text-align:right;" | −0.1%
|-
|-
| style="background-color:;" | 
| style="text-align:left;" |Independent
| style="text-align:right;" | 1
| style="text-align:right;" | 0
| style="text-align:right;" |  1
| style="text-align:right;" | -
| style="text-align:right;" | 417,895
| style="text-align:right;" | 0.5%
| style="text-align:right;" | −0.1%
|-
|-
| style="background-color:;" | 
| style="text-align:left;" |Green Party
| style="text-align:right;" | −
| style="text-align:right;" | −
| style="text-align:right;" | −
| style="text-align:right;" | −
| style="text-align:right;" | 243,391
| style="text-align:right;" | 0.3%
| style="text-align:right;" | -
|-
|-
| style="background-color:;" | 
| style="text-align:left;" |Constitution Party
| style="text-align:right;" | −
| style="text-align:right;" | −
| style="text-align:right;" | −
| style="text-align:right;" | −
| style="text-align:right;" | 91,133
| style="text-align:right;" | 0.1%
| style="text-align:right;" | −0.1%
|-
|-
| style="background-color:;" | 
| style="text-align:left;" |Independence Party
| style="text-align:right;" | −
| style="text-align:right;" | −
| style="text-align:right;" | −
| style="text-align:right;" | −
| style="text-align:right;" | 85,815
| style="text-align:right;" | 0.1%
| style="text-align:right;" | -
|-
|-
| style="background-color:;" | 
| style="text-align:left;" |Reform Party
| style="text-align:right;" | −
| style="text-align:right;" | −
| style="text-align:right;" | −
| style="text-align:right;" | −
| style="text-align:right;" | 53,862
| style="text-align:right;" | 0.1%
| style="text-align:right;" | −
|-
|-
| style="background-color:;" | 
| style="text-align:left;" |Other parties
| style="text-align:right;" | −
| style="text-align:right;" | −
| style="text-align:right;" | −
| style="text-align:right;" | −
| style="text-align:right;" | 1,230,548
| style="text-align:right;" | 1.5%
| style="text-align:right;" | −0.1%
|-
| style="background-color: #f2f2f2; text-align:right; font-weight: bold" colspan="2" | Totals
| style="text-align:right;background-color: #f2f2f2; font-weight: bold" | 435
| style="text-align:right;background-color: #f2f2f2; font-weight: bold" | 435
| style="text-align:right;background-color: #f2f2f2; font-weight: bold" | −
| style="text-align:right;background-color: #f2f2f2; font-weight: bold" | 100.0%
| style="text-align:right;background-color: #f2f2f2; font-weight: bold" | 80,975,537
| style="text-align:right;background-color: #f2f2f2; font-weight: bold" | 100.0%
| style="text-align:right;background-color: #f2f2f2; font-weight: bold" | −
|-
!style=text-align:left colspan=10|Voter turnout: 36.8%
|-
|- style="background-color:#E9E9E9"
| style="text-align:left;" colspan=9 |Sources: Election Statistics - Office of the Clerk

Voter demographics

Source: CNN exit poll

Maps

Open seats 
In the election, there were 32 open seats: 28 incumbents not seeking re-election and four vacancies. Of the 28 incumbents, 18 were Republicans, 9 Democrats, and 1 an independent.

Election predictions 

The following table rates the competitiveness of selected races from around the country according to Sabato's Crystal Ball. Races not included should be considered safe for the incumbent's party. (Incumbents not running for re-election have parentheses around their name.)

Seats that changed party 
Thirty Republican seats were picked up by Democrats, and one seat held by an independent was picked up by a Democrat. No Democratic seats were picked up by Republicans.

 : Early in the cycle, incumbent J. D. Hayworth (R) appeared on his way to an easy reelection. However, his seat may have become more competitive after the Congressional Page scandal broke. Democrats fielded a locally well-known candidate in State Senator Harry Mitchell, a former Mayor of Tempe. Mitchell has been a political force in his home town, one of the largest communities in the district, and Democrats became enthusiastic about his candidacy. The 5th leans Republican, but not overwhelmingly. The district includes, in addition to Tempe, Scottsdale, the prime real estate of the Phoenix area. On election night, Mitchell defeated Hayworth, 50% to 46%.

 : Incumbent Jim Kolbe (R) announced on November 23, 2005, that he would not seek re-election in 2006. His district, located in Southeastern Arizona and based in the suburbs of Tucson, is Republican-leaning, but competitive: President Bush won the district with 53% of the vote in 2004 (although only 50% in 2000). The Democratic primary in September was won by former State Senator Gabby Giffords, who resigned from the Arizona Legislature on December 1, 2005, in preparation for the campaign. Randy Graf, a former state Representative who lost to Kolbe in the 2004 primary, won the September 2006 Republican primary. He defeated current state Representative Steve Huffman, whom both Kolbe and the National Republican Congressional Committee supported. The NRCC reportedly became concerned that Graf (a supporter of the Minuteman Project, and a sponsor of an unsuccessful bill that would let patrons carry guns into bars and restaurants), was too conservative to win the district. The NRCC committed $122,000 for a television ad in support of Huffman, which ran the week before the primary. The Democratic party shared that assessment — prior to the primary, it spent nearly $200,000, "a large part of that for advertisements critical of Mr. Huffman in an effort to help Mr. Graf's candidacy." In late September, the national GOP canceled about $1 million in advertising support. Libertarian David Nolan and independent Jay Quick also ran for the seat. Giffords went on to win by a 54% to 42% margin. (For details, see 2006 Arizona's 8th congressional district election.)

 : Longtime incumbent Richard Pombo (R) won reelection in 2004 by a reasonably comfortable 61% to 39% margin. However, Pombo became associated with the ethical and legal scandals revolving around Jack Abramoff and became the subject of an investigation, which eroded his popular support. In addition, Rolling Stone listed him as one of the ten worst congressmen. The Democratic candidate who garnered the 39% in 2004, Jerry McNerney, joined that race as a write-in candidate two weeks before the primary election. In 2006, McNerney was challenged in the primary by Steve Filson. Filson was backed by the Democratic Congressional Campaign Committee but was upset by McNerney in the primary. Pombo was challenged for the Republican nomination by former Representative Pete McCloskey. Pombo won 63% of the primary vote to 32% for McCloskey. McCloskey eventually endorsed McNerney. The eleventh district is largely composed of Oakland suburbs and leans Republican. McNerney defeated Pombo 53% to 47% on election night.
 : Incumbent Bob Beauprez (R) was reelected to a second term in 2004 with 55% of the vote, after winning his first term by only 121 votes. His retirement to make an unsuccessful run for Governor of Colorado made this seat highly competitive. The 7th District is located in the northern and eastern Denver suburbs. State education chairman Rick O'Donnell was unopposed for the Republican nomination, while State Senator Ed Perlmutter won a three-way Democratic primary. On election night, Perlmutter won Beauprez's old seat as expected, 55% to 42%.
 : Incumbent Rob Simmons (R), a Vietnam War veteran and former CIA agent, won reelection by 54% to 46% in 2004, in a Democratic-leaning district encompassing eastern Connecticut, including Norwich and New London. The 2002 nominee, former state Representative Joe Courtney, decided to make another run. Even though in the past Simmons had been able to win elections in the Democratic-leaning district by painting himself as a moderate, the seat is perennially competitive. The results were so close on election night that the race was not settled until a week later. A recount was completed on November 14, 2006, with the final results giving Joe Courtney an 83-vote victory over Rob Simmons. It was the closest house race of 2006.
 : Although incumbent Nancy Johnson (R) won with at least 60% of the vote in 2004 and faced a difficult challenge (running against a fellow incumbent in a redrawn district) in 2002, winning with just 54%, she was still a Republican in a swing district. While the 5th is Connecticut's most conservative region, John Kerry won the district by about 1100 votes in 2004 and Al Gore won it when Johnson represented it as the 6th District in 2000. The district is located in Northwestern Connecticut and includes a large portion of Waterbury, Danbury, the wealthy western suburbs of Hartford, and small rural towns. Johnson faced a credible challenge from state Senator Chris Murphy. She was popular in the district, but with Bush's rating in New England at rock bottom, a Democratic victory was possible. Early in the cycle, this race was considered the least competitive of the three Republican-held seats in Connecticut, but Murphy defeated Johnson on election night, winning 56% to 44%.
 : This Republican-leaning South Florida district, which includes West Palm Beach and Port St. Lucie on the state's east coast, and Port Charlotte on the west coast, was represented by Mark Foley, head of the Missing and Exploited Children's Caucus. However, Foley resigned September 29, 2006, due to revelations of inappropriate contacts of a sexual nature with underage male congressional pages. The scandal immediately ballooned to include the Republican leadership's involvement in a possible cover-up, and it soon brought down Republicans nationwide. Florida law bars state parties from replacing candidates on the ballot. Within the district, the scandal created strong backlash against any Republican replacement due to Foley's name remaining on the ballot, and, by extension, made the race, which had earlier been written off by most as a "safe" Republican seat, highly competitive. Businessman Tim Mahoney, a surprisingly well-funded challenger in a seemingly uncompetitive race, quickly became favored to win. The Republican replacement, businessman Joe Negron, ran an effective "Punch Foley for Negron" campaign, but lost in a closer than expected race, with 48% to Mahoney's 49%.
 : Republican E. Clay Shaw had been in Congress since 1981, and had represented the 22nd District since 1993. The district voted for John Kerry over George Bush in 2004, but re-elected Shaw with 63% against a last minute replacement Democrat. In 2000, Shaw won a close race by 599 votes in a district that Al Gore won by 4%, but in 2002, he was redistricted into a slightly less Democratic district and scored an easy victory. The district includes wealthy areas of Palm Beach County and Broward County including Boca Raton and parts of Fort Lauderdale The revelation that Shaw was being treated for a second time for lung cancer may have affected his re-election chances. This year, Shaw faced a challenge from well-funded state senator Ron Klein. Klein won on election day 51% to 47%.
 : Chris Chocola (R) was first elected in 2002 by a 50% to 46% margin. Democrat Joe Donnelly, who lost to Chocola 54% to 45% in 2004, ran again in 2006. Democrats blamed Donnelly's 2004 loss on a lack of funding from the national party that allowed Chocola to outspend Donnelly by a two-to-one margin. President Bush visited the South Bend-centered district seven times between 2000 and 2006, suggesting that Chocola was vulnerable. Chocola's popularity was also affected by the unpopularity of GOP Governor Mitch Daniels; among other things, Daniels decided to lease a toll road that runs through the district to a foreign corporation. Daniels also pushed to move the entire state to daylight saving time, which was opposed by local residents. In the campaign, Chocola attacked Donnelly for being delinquent in paying property taxes. On election night, Donnelly defeated Chocola 54% to 46%.
 : John Hostettler (R), who had only a 34% approval rating, was challenged by Vanderburgh County Sheriff Brad Ellsworth in this swing district that includes Evansville and Terre Haute. Hostettler had a history of winning tough reelections, but Ellsworth was considered to be his strongest opponent. The district has been nicknamed "The Bloody Eighth" due to its frequent ousting of incumbent congressmen, which has occurred in 1958, 1966, 1974, 1978, 1982, 1994, and 2006. Despite the competitive nature of the district, Hostettler was traditionally slow to raise money and lagged far behind his opponent in fundraising totals throughout the election. Rumors circulated in September that Hostettler had essentially given up on his campaign when he failed to hold any events on Labor Day weekend, the traditional kickoff of the campaign season. In the end, Ellsworth defeated Hostettler by a 61%–39% margin, the most lopsided loss for a House incumbent since 1994.
 : In 2004, incumbent Mike Sodrel (R) defeated then-incumbent Baron Hill by only 1,425 votes, the smallest winning percentage in any congressional race that year. Hill ran in 2006 to reclaim his seat in this Southeast Indiana district that includes Bloomington and New Albany. He defeated anti-war challenger Gretchen Clearwater in the May 2 primary. Factors cited in the race included Sodrel being a self-described staunch Republican Party loyalist in an evenly divided district, Hill lacking the advantages of incumbency in 2006, and (according to Democrats) Hill's superior constituent service compared to Sodrel's. Hill defeated Sodrel 50% to 46%.
 : Incumbent Jim Nussle (R) left his seat in Congress to run for governor. This district is Democratic-leaning, and of the open seats was one of the most likely to change hands. It contains most of northeastern Iowa including large cities such as Dubuque, the Quad Cities and Waterloo. Nussle had been reelected in 2000 and 2004 with 55% of the vote but Al Gore and John Kerry won the district in those same years. In 2006, businessman Mike Whalen won the Republican nomination while attorney Bruce Braley was the Democratic nominee. Braley defeated Whalen 55 percent to 43 percent. (For details, see 2006 Iowa's 1st congressional district election.)
 : Incumbent Jim Leach (R) received 59% of the vote in 2004. Before the election, this was the most Democratic seat held by a Republican, as measured by presidential candidates' performances in the district. However, Leach had consistently won here since 1976, helped by his reputation for strong integrity. Also helping him was his status as one of the most liberal Republicans in the House. As a result, Leach traditionally won large numbers of crossover votes from Democrats and was expected to do so again. The Democrats nominated David Loebsack, a political science professor at small Cornell College in Mount Vernon, Iowa. Despite Leach's appeal and seniority, Loebsack prevailed on election night by a 51% to 49% margin. Leach's defeat made him the most senior House member to lose re-election in 2006 and the most senior member to lose re-election since 36-year incumbent Phil Crane lost in 2004 in an upset to Melissa Bean.
 : Incumbent Jim Ryun (R), a leading conservative, won re-election by 56% to 41% in 2004 and had held his seat for five terms. This year, Ryun faced a rematch with Democrat Nancy Boyda, who also ran against him in 2004. The district is home to Topeka, Manhattan (location of Kansas State University), Leavenworth, Pittsburg, and half of the liberal college town of Lawrence, home of the University of Kansas. Despite being held by Ryun, the seat had a history of electing Democrats and before 1994, Democrats held the seat for 20 out of 24 years. However, gerrymandering had made the seat tilt more Republican, and Ryun was thought to be secure. However, Ryun faced controversy over a Washington, D.C. real estate purchase, and in the wake of scandals that rocked Washington, D.C., this had a major effect on local voters, far more than had been expected. Boyda was also helped by the reelection of popular Democratic Governor Kathleen Sebelius. Boyda defeated the incumbent Ryun 51% to 47%, in one of the most shocking results of the night.
 : Incumbent Anne Northup (R) had been a target for the Democrats since her election in 1996; in 2004 and 2000, John Kerry and Al Gore both won her Louisville-centered congressional district by two percent, and Bill Clinton won the district by double-digit margins during the 1990s. While Northup had generally run close races, she won 60% of the vote in the 2004 election. Redistricting after the 2000 census added a few more suburban Republicans to the district, according to Congressional Quarterly. The Democratic candidate was John Yarmuth, the founder of local free publication LEO. In spite of Northup's electoral success, excellent constituent services, and popularity among blue-collar voters in southern Louisville, Democrats saw this race as winnable, calling attention to Northup's 91% lockstep voting record with an unpopular President Bush. Northup led in most polls until October, when Yarmuth began to gain. By election night, the race had become highly competitive. House Majority Leader John Boehner referred to Northup as the Republicans' "canary in the coal mine", meaning that her fortunes would portend the outcome of House elections nationwide. This proved to be a correct assessment, as on election night, Yarmuth defeated Northup 51% to 48% and Republicans lost control of the House.
 : Incumbent Gil Gutknecht (R) was reelected in his Southern Minnesota district with 60% of the vote in 2004. A member of the 1994 Republican Revolution, Gutknecht had promised not to run for a seventh term when first elected. Though not expected to be significant, the broken promise proved to be a factor in his defeat. Geography teacher Tim Walz was the Democratic nominee and ran a much stronger campaign than expected, helped by the massive decline in President George W. Bush's popularity in Minnesota. Walz defeated Gutknecht 53%–47%.
 : Republican incumbent Jeb Bradley was seeking a third term. Rochester Democratic chair Carol Shea-Porter won the nomination in a major upset against better funded and party-favored state House Democratic Leader Jim Craig. Although this was the one house district in New England Bush carried in 2004, and Bradley had won it handily in the past, the President was highly unpopular throughout New England, which gave Democrats an opening. Still, most thought that Bradley was the strong favorite to win. Shea-Porter defeated Bradley 52% to 48% in the most shocking upset of the night, along with the victories of David Loebsack and Nancy Boyda.
 : Incumbent Charles Bass (R) won reelection in 2004 with 58% percent of the vote, even as his district was won by John Kerry 52% to 47%. Bass, a political moderate, easily defeated primary challenges from Berlin Mayor Bob Danderson and Mary Maxwell. The Democratic nominee, Paul Hodes, an attorney, was also the 2004 Democratic nominee. In late September, a top Bass staffer resigned after news stories that a U.S. Government computer in Bass's DC office had been used to post anonymous concern troll messages to NH blogs. In these messages, "IndyNH" claimed to be a supporter of Paul Hodes who was discouraged by Bass's unbeatable lead. Hodes defeated Bass on election day, 53% to 46%.
 : Incumbent Sue Kelly (R) had rarely faced stiff competition since her initial election in 1994, but the Democratic primary attracted six contenders in 2006, two of whom dropped out before the primary. Former Ulster County Legislator John Hall, who was once a member of the popular rock band, Orleans, won the Democratic nomination with 49% of the vote in a multi-candidate primary. An October 26 Majority-Watch poll had him leading 49% to 47%. Several factors played into Kelly's defeat, including the extremely weak GOP showing in the senatorial and gubernatorial races, her reluctance to answer questions about the Mark Foley Page Scandal (notoriously, she literally ran away from television cameras at one point), and Hall's quirky campaign style, which included an appearance on the satirical Comedy Central program The Colbert Report. Hall defeated Kelly 51% to 49%. Following Hall's election, Stephen Colbert took credit for the victory and attributed it entirely to Hall's appearance on the show. Hall appeared several days later to satirically thank the host for his seat in Congress.
 : Incumbent John E. Sweeney (R) had never faced a particularly competitive election until 2006. His competitive district fueled a strong challenge from attorney Kirsten Gillibrand. In April 2006, Sweeney was allegedly sighted intoxicated at a fraternity party. On October 31, a week before the election, police report surfaced that documented a 911 call from his wife asking for help because her husband was "knocking her around the room". Despite denials from both Sweeney and his wife, the report proved to be a turning point and Gillibrand was victorious on election night, 53% to 47%. (For details, see 2006 New York's 20th congressional district election.)
 : Incumbent Sherwood Boehlert (R) announced his retirement after 24 years, making this a seat of considerable focus for the Democrats in the run up to the mid terms. Boehlert is considered a moderate Republican, and the district is considered to be competitive. George Bush won by 53% in the 2004 election, but by only 3,000 votes in the 2000 presidential election. The Republican nominee was state Senator Ray Meier, while the Democratic nominee was Oneida County District Attorney Mike Arcuri. Both were locally popular and proven vote-getters and the race was a toss-up. Arcuri defeated Meier 54% to 45%.
 : Charles H. Taylor (R) won with 55% in 2004, far behind George W. Bush in the area. The district consists of the North Carolina Panhandle around Asheville. Dogged by ethics-related scandals, Taylor faced tougher competition from former professional quarterback Heath Shuler (D) in 2006. A July 10 poll by Public Policy Polling showed that Shuler led Taylor by 51% to 45% . Shuler defeated Taylor 54%–46%.

 : Bob Ney (R), the incumbent since 1995, part of the Jack Abramoff Indian lobbying scandal, withdrew from the race in early August 2006, before pleading guilty a month later to criminal charges. Zack Space, the law director of the city of Dover, was the surprise winner of the Democratic nomination. Ney's formal withdrawal on August 14 resulted in a special election to choose his replacement; Ohio state Senator Joy Padgett won with about 65% of the vote. Her candidacy was subsequently damaged by news reports about her business and personal bankruptcies. Space defeated Padgett, 62% to 38%.
 : Jason Altmire (D) upset incumbent Republican Melissa Hart in a surprise victory for the Democrats in this suburban Pittsburgh district. Altmire's background was in health care policy and legislative relations; he was overseer of the University of Pittsburgh Medical Center's Office of Charitable Giving before leaving to run for office in June 2005. Hart had seemed untouchable only a few months before the election, and Hart had seemed untouchable only a few months before the electionwas still generally expected to win on Election Day. Hart blamed her defeat on Altmire's campaign ads that tied her with the locally unpopular president. Altmire defeated Hart, 52% to 48%.
 : Curt Weldon (R) won reelection with 59% of the vote in 2004, but represents a Democratic-leaning district that incorporates much of Delaware County in suburban Philadelphia. He faced retired Navy Vice Admiral Joe Sestak (D). On October 13, it was reported that Weldon and his daughter were being investigated by the FBI, and two days later the FBI raided his daughter's residence. Between Sestak's fundraising abilities, and the investigation of Weldon and his daughter, Sestak defeated Weldon, 56% to 44%.
 : Mike Fitzpatrick (R) won election for the first time in 2004 by a wide 56–42 margin over Virginia "Ginny" Schrader, but his district, based in suburban Bucks County, is politically moderate, having voted for Democratic presidents and Republican congressmen since 1992. His Democratic opponent in 2006 was retired Captain Patrick Murphy, an Iraq War veteran of the Army's 82nd Airborne. The Iraq War was the major issue of the campaign. In 2005, Murphy proposed a plan for phased withdrawal; Fitzpatrick stood by President Bush's stay-the-course policy through most of the campaign, before calling for a new plan. Ultimately, Murphy defeated Fitzpatrick by 1,518 votes.
 : Don Sherwood (R) had strong backing as a result of redistricting in this heavy GOP district. The Democrats didn't even field a candidate to run against him in 2002 and 2004. But in 2005 details were made public regarding a five-year affair between Sherwood and Cynthia Ore, who sued Sherwood for $5.5 million alleging physical abuse. On November 8, 2005, the two settled out of court for an undisclosed amount. Sherwood was expected to win the Republican primary easily over teacher Kathy Scott, as she had very little money or campaign staff, but she polled a surprising 44% of the vote against him. His Democratic opponent was professor and U.S. Naval Reserve officer Chris Carney. Carney led in the polls for most of the fall. Carney defeated Sherwood 53% to 47%. For details, see 2006 Pennsylvania's 10th congressional district election.
 : Incumbent former House Majority Leader Tom DeLay (R) won the primary, then retired, leaving his seat vacant, and dropped out of the re-election race. These events followed a number of corruption charges that made DeLay the focus of a September 28, 2005, indictment by a grand jury in Travis County (which includes Austin) over his campaign finances related to Texans for a Republican Majority (TRMPAC) and another political action committee, ARMPAC. In 2004, DeLay won 55% of the vote against a relatively unknown Democrat, environmental lawyer Richard Morrison, even though George W. Bush carried the suburban Houston district with 64% of the vote. Democrats sued to keep DeLay as the Republican nominee when he withdrew, citing a lack of proof of residence outside the district, since Texas law does not allow a party to replace its nominee unless the candidate cannot run due to extraordinary circumstances or if he or she moves away. The Democrats won the suit, and DeLay was forced to remain on the ballot or leave his party without a nominee. Republicans quickly rallied around Shelley Sekula-Gibbs to run a write-in campaign to defeat Nick Lampson the Democratic nominee. Lampson defeated Sekula-Gibbs 52%–42%.
 : In 2004, incumbent Henry Bonilla (R) received nearly 70% of the vote. However, his district, which includes several heavily Republican suburbs of San Antonio, as well as Big Bend National Park and much of Texas' border with Mexico, had to be changed after a mid-2006 U.S. Supreme Court ruling that the redistricting efforts of the Texas Legislature violated Voting Rights Act protection of minorities — largely Hispanic Laredo was in the 23rd District until the redistricting. On August 4, a federal court redrew the district and removed the portion of Webb County that was in the district, eliminating the possibility of a rematch with Cuellar, and added a heavily Democratic portion of San Antonio, the home base of liberal former congressman Ciro Rodriguez. Rodriguez ran against Bonilla in the all-candidate primary on November 7. The winner of the now somewhat irrelevant Democratic primary, Vietnam War combat veteran Rick Bolanos, also ran in the November 7 election. The realigned district is less Republican than the previous version, but Bonilla was still favored against the crowded field of six Democrats, including Rodriguez and Bolanos, and one Independent candidate. A majority was required in this special election to avoid a runoff between the top two contenders. Bonilla won the November 7 election with 49% of the vote, but failed to get the needed 50% of the vote to avoid the runoff. In that runoff, he faced Rodriguez, who got 20% of the special election vote. Bonilla was seen as being the favorite. He ignored Rodriguez until the final days, then ran TV ads portraying him as politically aligned with some Islamic terror supporters, which backfired. In the special election however, Rodriguez was able to portray himself as part of an incoming majority, which would help retain federal funding for programs in the district. Rodriguez defeated Bonilla in the runoff 54% to 46%.
 : Incumbent Bernie Sanders (I), a democratic socialist who represented the entire state of Vermont, ran for the Senate seat being vacated by Senator Jim Jeffords. Vermont state Senate President Pro Tempore Peter Welch (D-Windsor County), the Democratic nominee, faced former Vermont Adjutant General Martha Rainville, Major General, USANG (ret.), the Republican nominee. Welch was helped when state Representative David Zuckerman decided not to wage a third-party campaign. Keith Stern, a businessman and zoning board member from Springfield, ran as an Independent; Jane Newton, a retired nurse, ran on the socialist Liberty Union line; and Jerry Trudell ran as an Independent. Welch defeated Rainville 53% to 45%.
 : Incumbent Mark Green (R) — Green ran for governor, and his seat, in northeastern Wisconsin, was Republican-leaning, although it has elected a Democratic congressman as recently as 1996 and is centered around the cities of Green Bay and Appleton. State Assembly Speaker John Gard won the September 12 Republican primary as expected, in which he faced state Assemblywoman Terri McCormick. The Democratic nominee, Steve Kagen M.D., defeated business consultant Jamie Wall and former De Pere Mayor and Brown County Executive Nancy Nusbaum after a very competitive primary. Kagen defeated Gard 51% to 49%. (For details, see 2006 Wisconsin's 8th congressional district election.)

Special elections 

There were two special elections in 2006 to the 109th United States Congress, listed here by date and district.

|-
! 
| Duke Cunningham
| 
| 1990
|  | Incumbent resigned December 1, 2005 amid the Cunningham scandal.New member elected June 6, 2006.Republican hold.
| nowrap | 

|-
! 
| Tom DeLay
| 
| 1984
|  | Incumbent resigned June 9, 2006 following indictment.New member elected November 7, 2006.Republican hold.
| nowrap | 

|}

Alabama

Alaska

Arizona

Arkansas

California

Colorado

Connecticut

Delaware

Florida

Georgia 

Georgia's delegation was redistricted in 2005.

Hawaii

Idaho

Illinois

Indiana

Iowa

Kansas

Kentucky

Louisiana

Maine

Maryland

Massachusetts

Michigan

Minnesota

Mississippi

Missouri

Montana

Nebraska

Nevada

New Hampshire

New Jersey

New Mexico

New York

North Carolina

North Dakota

Ohio

Oklahoma

Oregon

Pennsylvania

Rhode Island

South Carolina

South Dakota

Tennessee

Texas 

Texas's 22nd district was held by Tom DeLay who had resigned. The Democratic Party sued to prevent the Republican Party from replacing Tom DeLay (who was determined to be the candidate in March 2006) with another candidate. The courts agreed with the Democratic Party and the Supreme Court has refused to hear the appeal. On August 8, 2006, Tom DeLay officially withdrew his name as the Republican candidate. (The court decision did not allow the Republican Party from changing its candidate, however it did not prevent Tom DeLay from withdrawing altogether.)

Texas's 23rd district was declared unconstitutional by the Supreme Court of the United States, which ordered the district re-drawn. This affected the 15th, 21st, 23rd, 25th, and 28th districts, which had a blanket primary on Election Day, followed by a runoff on December 6 in District 23, where no candidate got a majority of the vote.

Utah

Vermont

Virginia

Washington

West Virginia

Wisconsin

Wyoming

Non-voting delegates

See also 
 2006 United States elections
 2006 United States gubernatorial elections
 2006 United States Senate elections
 109th United States Congress
 110th United States Congress
 Fighting Dems

Notes

References

External links 
 2006 Election Guide The New York Times
 check on voter registration
 2006 Election Projections Survey
 United States Election 2006 Web Archive from the U.S. Library of Congress